Mohamed Mamdouh Hashem Shebib (born 1 April 1989) is an Egyptian handball player for Dinamo București and Egyptian national team.

He represented Egypt at the World Men's Handball Championship in 2017, 2019 and 2021, and in the 2016 Summer Olympics in Rio de Janeiro, in the men's handball tournament.

Honours
Club
Zamalek
Egyptian Handball League
Winner: 2009–10, 2015–16
Egyptian Handball Cup
Winner: 2016
IHF Super Globe
Bronze Medal: 2010
African Handball Champions League
Winner: 2010, 2011, 2015
African Handball Cup Winners' Cup
Winner: 2010, 2011, 2016
African Handball Super Cup
Winner: 2010, 2011, 2012
Luxembourg International Handball Championship
Winner: 2015

El Jaish SC
Qatar Handball League
Winner: 2013-14
Emir of Qatar Cup
Winner: 2013-14
Qatar Cup
Winner: 2014-15
Asian Club League Handball Championship
Winner: 2013, 2014
IHF Super Globe
Bronze Medal: 2013

Montpellier
EHF Champions League
Winner: 2018
Trophée des Champions
Winner: 2017–18

Dinamo București
Liga Națională
Winner: 2021
Romanian Cup
Winner: 2020, 2021
Romanian Super Cup
Winner: 2020

International
Egypt
African Games
Gold Medalist: 2015 
African Championship
Gold Medalist: 2016 
Gold Medalist: 2020
Silver Medalist: 2010
Silver Medalist: 2018

Individual
Best Pivot of the African Championship 2016, 2018

References

External links

1989 births
Living people
Egyptian male handball players
Olympic handball players of Egypt
Handball players at the 2016 Summer Olympics
Expatriate handball players
Egyptian expatriate sportspeople in France
Egyptian expatriate sportspeople in Romania
Montpellier Handball players
CS Dinamo București (men's handball) players
Sportspeople from Cairo
African Games gold medalists for Egypt
African Games medalists in handball
Competitors at the 2015 African Games
Handball players at the 2020 Summer Olympics
Competitors at the 2013 Mediterranean Games
Mediterranean Games gold medalists for Egypt
Mediterranean Games medalists in handball
21st-century Egyptian people